The British Blues Awards were inaugurated in 2010. The prize was awarded in various categories, such as 'Male vocals', 'Female vocals', 'Guitarist', 'Bass player' and 'Keyboard player', 'Blues band', 'Young artist', 'Blues album', 'Blues festival' and 'Lifetime achievement'.

The Awards were suspended in 2017, due to technical problems surrounding the validity of the online public voting system, which over time had become susceptible to abuse.

British Blues Awards Hall of Fame 
The entrants to the "British Blues Awards Hall of Fame", who have won a category three years in a row, are shown below. Members of the Hall of Fame can no longer be nominated for the British Blues Awards in the respective category.
 Matt Schofield – Guitarist 2010–2012
 Andy Graham – Bass player 2010–2012
 Paul Jones – Harmonica player 2010–2012
 Joe Bonamassa – Overseas artist 2010–2012
 Ian Siegal – Male vocals 2011–2013
 The Paul Jones Rhythm and Blues Show – Blues broadcaster 2011 (exception to the three-year rule)
 Hebden Bridge – Blues festival 2012–2014
 King King – Band 2012–2014

Awards
The following is a list in chronological order of the award winners in the various categories.

Male vocals 
 2010: Oli Brown
 2011: Ian Siegal
 2012: Ian Siegal
 2013: Ian Siegal
 2014: Alan Nimmo
 2015: Alan Nimmo
 2016: Alan Nimmo

Female vocals 
 2010: Joanne Shaw Taylor
 2011: Joanne Shaw Taylor
 2012: Chantel McGregor
 2013: Chantel McGregor
 2014: Jo Harman
 2015: Dani Wilde
 2016: Rebecca Downes

Blues band 
 2010: Ian Siegal Band
 2011: Oli Brown Band
 2012: King King
 2013: King King
 2014: King King
 2015: The Nimmo Brothers
 2016: The Nimmo Brothers

Harmonica player 
 2010: Paul Jones
 2011: Paul Jones
 2012: Paul Jones
 2013: Paul Lamb
 2014: Paul Lamb
 2015: Paul Lamb
 2016: Mark Feltham

Guitarist 
 2010: Matt Schofield
 2011: Matt Schofield
 2012: Matt Schofield
 2013: Chantel McGregor
 2014: Chantel McGregor
 2015: Aynsley Lister
 2016: Laurence Jones

Acoustic act 
 2012: Ian Siegal
 2013: Marcus Bonfanti
 2014: Marcus Bonfanti
 2015: Ian Siegal
 2016: Ian Siegal

Bass player 
 2010: Andy Graham
 2011: Andy Graham
 2012: Andy Graham
 2013: Lindsay Coulson
 2014: Lindsay Coulson
 2015: Norman Watt-Roy
 2016: Lindsay Coulson

Keyboard player 
 2010: Jonny Henderson
 2011: Jonny Henderson
 2012: Paddy Milner
 2013: Bennett Holland
 2014: Steve Watts
 2015: Paddy Milner
 2016: Paul Long

Drummer 
 2010: Simon Dring
 2011: Wayne Proctor
 2012: Stephen Cutmore
 2014: Wayne Proctor
 2015: Wayne Proctor
 2015: Wayne Proctor
 2016: Andrew Naumann

Instrumentalist 
 2010: Son Henry
 2011: Son Henry
 2012: Becky Tate
 2013: Becky Tate
 2014: Sarah Skinner (Red Dirt Skinners)
 2015: Becky Tate
 2016: Becky Tate

Young artist 
 2010: Oli Brown
 2011: Chantel McGregor
 2012: Oli Brown
 2013: Dan Owen / Lucy Zirins
 2014: Laurence Jones
 2015: Laurence Jones
 2016: Laurence Jones

Blues festival 
 2010: Blues On The Farm
 2011: Great British Rhythm And Blues Festival
 2012: Hebden Bridge Blues Festival
 2013: Hebden Bridge Blues Festival
 2014: Hebden Bridge Blues Festival
 2015: Upton Blues Festival
 2016: Upton Blues Festival

Overseas artist 
 2010: Joe Bonamassa
 2011: Joe Bonamassa
 2012: Joe Bonamassa
 2013: Walter Trout
 2014: Walter Trout
 2015: Walter Trout
 2016: Buddy Guy

Blues broadcaster 
 2011: Paul Jones
(Category replaced as below)

Independent blues broadcaster 
 2012: Gary Grainger
 2013: Dave Raven
 2014: Dave Watkins
 2015: Dave Raven
 2016: Paul Long

Lifetime achievement 
 2010: Colin Staples
 2011: Paul Jones
 2012: Paul Oliver
 2013: Mike Vernon / Barry Middleton
 2014: Philip Guy Davis / Bill & Joyce Harrison
 2015: Paul Dean New Crawdaddy Club
 2016: Pete Feenstra

Blues album 
 2010: Heads, Tails & Aces – Matt Schofield
 2011: Heads I Win Tails You Lose – Oli Brown
 2012: Take My Hand – King King
 2013: Candy Store Kid – Ian Siegal and the Mississippi Mudbloods
 2014: Standing in the Shadows – King King
 2015: Going Back Home – Wilko Johnson and Roger Daltrey
 2016: Reaching For The Light – King King

Kevin Thorpe Award for Songwriter of the Year 
 2011: Joanne Shaw Taylor for "Same As It Never Was"
 2012: Marcus Bonfanti for "The Bittersweet"
 2013: Ian Siegal for "I Am The Train"
 2014: Aynsley Lister
 2015: Katie Bradley and Dudley Ross
 2016: King King

Song 
 2014: "Home" – Aynsley Lister
 2015: "Mud Honey" – Joanne Shaw Taylor
 2016: "Rush Hour" – King King

Barry Middleton Memorial Award for Emerging Artist 
 2014: King Size Slim
 2015: Kaz Hawkins
 2016: Rebecca Downes

British blues great 
 2015: John Mayall and Chris Barber
 2016: Papa George and The Hoax

See also
British blues

References

External links
 Official website

Blues music awards
British music awards
Awards established in 2010
2010 establishments in the United Kingdom
Music halls of fame